Bouillon Castle is a medieval castle located in Wallonia in the town of Bouillon in the province of Luxembourg, Belgium.

Although it was mentioned first in 988, there has been a castle on the same site for a much longer time. The castle is situated on a rocky spur of land within a sharp bend of the Semois River.

In 1082, Bouillon Castle was inherited by Godfrey of Bouillon, who sold it to Otbert, Bishop of Liège in order to finance the First Crusade. The castle was later fitted for heavy artillery by Vauban, Louis XIV's military architect in the late 17th century.

See also
List of castles in Belgium

References

External links

Tourist office of Bouillon

Buildings and structures completed in the 10th century
Buildings and structures completed in the 17th century
Wallonia's Major Heritage
Castles in the Ardennes (Belgium)
Historic house museums in Belgium
Castles in Belgium
Castles in Luxembourg (Belgium)
Museums in Luxembourg (Belgium)
Bouillon